Agudat Ḥovevei Sfat Ever (i.e. "Hebrew language lovers society") was a national organization founded in the early 1900s to promote the study of Hebrew and its literature in the Russian Empire. A precursor of the Tarbut movement, more than sixty chapters of Agudat Ḥovevei Sfat Ever were established across Russia, and the society operated a network of Hebrew-language kindergartens and teachers' schools. It was forcibly disbanded by the Communist regime in 1917.

References

1917 disestablishments in Russia
Defunct Jewish organizations
Jewish educational organizations
Zionist youth movements
Hebrew language
Jewish organizations based in Russia